Lester Cove is a cove forming the southernmost part of Andvord Bay, on the west coast of Graham Land, Antarctica. It was charted by the Belgian Antarctic Expedition under Gerlache, 1897–99, and was named by the UK Antarctic Place-Names Committee in 1960 for Maxime Charles Lester (1891–1957), who, with Thomas W. Bagshawe, wintered at nearby Waterboat Point in 1921.

References

Coves of Graham Land
Danco Coast